This is a list of fiction writers in Malayalam language.

A - B 
Akbar Kakkattil (1954–)
Anand (1936–)
B. M. Suhara

C - D 
C. Radhakrishnan (1939–)
C. V. Balakrishnan (1952-)
C. V. Raman Pillai (1858–1922)
C. V. Sreeraman (1931–2007)
Chandramathi (Chandrika Balan) (1954-)

E - F 
E. Harikumar (1943–)
E. V. Krishna Pillai (1894–1938)

G - H 
G. R. Indugopan (1974–)
George Onakkoor

I - J 
Jose Panachippuram (1951–)
Joy J. Kaimaparamban (1939–)

K - L 
K. P. Ramanunni (1955–)
K. Saraswathi Amma (1919–1975)
K. Surendran (1921–1997)
Kakkanadan (1935–)
Kanam EJ (1926–1982)
Karoor Neelakanta Pillai (1898–1975)
Kottayam Pushpanath (1937–2018)
Kovilan (1923–2010)
Lajo Jose
Lalithambika Antharjanam (1909–1987)
Leela Devi (1932–1998)

M - N 
N. Prabhakaran (1952–)
M. Mukundan (1942–)
M. Sukumaran (1943–)
M. P. Narayana Pillai (1939–1998)
M. T. Vasudevan Nair (1933–)
Madampu Kunjukuttan (1941–)
Madhavikkutti (Kamala Surayya) (1934–2009)
Malayatoor Ramakrishnan (1927–1999)
Maythil Radhakrishnan (1944–)
Muttathu Varkey (1917–1989)
Nalini Bekal (1954-)
N. P. Mohammed (1929–2003)
N. S. Madhavan (1948–)
Nandanar (1926-1999)

O - P 
O. Chandhu Menon (1847–1899)
O. V. Vijayan (1931–2005)
P. Ayyaneth (1928-2008)
P. Kesavadev (1905–1983)
P. Padmarajan (1945–1991)
P. Surendran (1961–)
P. Valsala (1938–)
P. F. Mathews (1960-)
P. C. Sanal Kumar (1949–)
P. K. Balakrishnan (1926–1991)
Pamman (1920–2007)
Parappurath (1924–1981)
Perumbadavam Sreedharan (1938–)
Ponkunnam Varkey (1911–2004)
Punathil Kunjabdulla (1940–2017)

Q - R 
Raghunath Paleri
Rajalakshmi (1930–1965)
Rajesh Chithira

S - T 
 Sankar
S. K. Pottekkatt (1913–1982)
Sarah Joseph (1946–)
Sethu (1942–)
Sumangala (1934–)
Thakazhi Sivasankara Pillai (1912–1999)
T. Padmanabhan (1931–)
T. V. Varkey (1938–)
Thikkodiyan (1916–2001)
T.V. Kochubava (1955-1999)

U - V 
Unnikrishnan Puthoor (1933–)
Uroob (1915–1979)
V. Balakrishnan (1932–2004)
Vaikom Chandrasekharan Nair (1920–2005)
Vaikom Muhammad Basheer (1908–1994)
Veloor Krishnankutty (1929–2003)
Vengayil Kunhiraman Nayanar (1861–1914)
Vilasini (1928–1993)
VKN (1932–2004)
v.r.sankar

W - Z 
Zacharia

See also
List of people from Kerala

Malayalam-language writers
Lists of people from Kerala